{{DISPLAYTITLE:Phenyl-D-galactopyranoside}}

Phenyl--galactopyranoside is a substituted galactoside.

See also 
Lac operon

References 

Galactosides
Phenol ethers